Natalya Sergeyevna Bondarchuk (born 10 May 1950) is a Soviet and Russian actress and film director, best known for her appearance in Andrei Tarkovsky's Solaris as "Hari". She is the daughter of a Soviet director and actor Sergei Bondarchuk and the Russian actress Inna Makarova. Her half-brother is the film director and actor Fedor Bondarchuk; her half-sister is the actress Yelena Bondarchuk.

Biography
Natalya Bondarchuk was born in Moscow to Soviet director and actor Sergei Bondarchuk and the Russian actress Inna Makarova. In 1971 she graduated from the acting school of the Gerasimov Institute of Cinematography and in 1975 from the directing school there.

She made her film debut in 1969 in Sergei Gerasimov's By the Lake, followed by the 1971 productions You and Me, by Larisa Shepitko, and A Soldier Came Back from the Front, by Nikolai Gubenko. She became internationally famous for her role as "Hari" in Andrei Tarkovsky's Solaris in 1972. It was her favorite role. She was also Tarkovsky's favorite of the film, as he wrote in his diary that "Natalya B. has outshone everybody".

In 1973 she met her future husband Nikolai Burlyayev on the set of the Nikolai Mashchenko film How the Steel Was Tempered. The two later withdrew from their participation in this film. In 1976 their son Ivan was born.

She played princess Mariya Volkonskaya in the 1975 historical film The Captivating Star of Happiness by Vladimir Motyl.

As a director, Bondarchuk debuted with the episode The Hapless Matrenka in Old Times in Poshekhonia (1975), an original adaptation of a novel by 19th-century satirist Mikhail Saltykov-Shchedrin, which was her diploma work. In 1982 she directed her first feature film, Zhivaya raduga (Living Rainbow). The film was produced in Yalta. In 1985 she directed the film Bambi's Childhood, and in 1986 the film Bambi's Youth. She also directed the Nikolai Leskov adaptation Lord, Hear My Prayer (1991). Bondarchuk has always acted in her own films, as have her longtime husband, Nikolai Burliaev, and their son, Ivan Burliaev.
Bondarchuk has taught at VGIK since 1979.

Natalya Bondarchuk also leads a child opera theater on Krasnaya Presnya in Moscow. Her son Ivan Burlyayev sang in this theater during his childhood.

Filmography

As actress
 1969 : By the Lake as passenger train
 1971 : You and Me as Nadya
 1972 : Solaris as Hari 
 1975 : The Captivating Star of Happiness as Volkonskaya
 1976 : Red and Black  as Madame de Rênal
 1980 : The Youth of Peter the Great  as Sophia Alekseyevna of Russia
 1982 : Living Rainbow as Mariya Sergeyevna 
 1985 : Bambi's Childhood  as Bambi's mother
 1986 : Lermontov as Mariya Mikhailovna Lermontova, Mikhail Lermontov's mother

As director

 1982 :  Living Rainbow 
 1985 :  Bambi's Childhood 
 1986 :  Bambi's Youth 
 1991 :  God, hear my prayer 
 2006 :  Pushkin: The Last Duel 
 2015 :  Snow Queen

References

External links
 Official Homepage 
 

1950 births
Living people
Actresses from Moscow
Natalya
Russian people of Ukrainian descent
Gerasimov Institute of Cinematography alumni
Soviet film directors
Russian film actresses
Soviet film actresses
Soviet women film directors
Honored Artists of the RSFSR
Sergei Bondarchuk